The year 2023 is the 242nd year of the Rattanakosin Kingdom of Thailand. It is the eighth year in the reign of King Vajiralongkorn (Rama X), and is reckoned as year 2566 in the Buddhist Era.

Incumbents 
 King: Vajiralongkorn
 Prime Minister: Prayut Chan-o-cha
 Supreme Patriarch: Ariyavongsagatanana (Amborn Ambaro)

Events

Ongoing events 
 COVID-19 pandemic in Thailand

Scheduled events 
 7 May – 2023 Thai general election

Deaths

February
5 February – Nukun Prachuapmo, politician, minister of transport (1991–1992, 1992).

References 

2023 in Thailand
Thailand
Thailand
2020s in Thailand
Years of the 21st century in Thailand